Capulina contra las momias ("Capulina Against the Mummies") is a 1973 Mexican comedy horror film written, produced, and directed by Alfredo Zacarías. It stars Gaspar Henaine as Capulina and Jacqueline Voltaire as his romantic interest.

Cast
Gaspar Henaine as Capulina
Jacqueline Voltaire as Jackie
Freddy Fernández as The Nephew
Enrique Pontón as The Scientist
Miguel Ángel Sanroman as The Mummy / The Monday Thief
Manuel Dondé as The Dead One
Cristóbal Martell as the Second Mummy
Citlali Breceda as a Rejuvenated Mummy
Argentina Candelario as a Rejuvenated Mummy
Dinorah Cornejo as a Rejuvenated Mummy
Susana Álvarez as a Rejuvenated Mummy
Leticia Perdigón as a Rejuvenated Mummy
Sessi Castin as a Rejuvenated Mummy
Cecilia Leger as Capulina's Mother

External links

1970s comedy horror films
Mexican comedy horror films
1973 films
1970s Spanish-language films
1970s Mexican films